Stephen Olumide Arigbabu (born 15 February 1972) is a German professional basketball coach and former player. He is 2.08 m (6 ft 10 in) tall. Arigbabu played at the center position.

Professional career
During his professional career, Arigbabu played in top-class teams such as ALBA Berlin, Panionios, and Maroussi. He won the EuroCup Challenge with Mitteldeutscher in 2004. He also won 2 German League championships, and a German Cup with ALBA Berlin.

National team career
Arigbabu was also a player of the senior men's German national basketball team, and he won a bronze medal with them at the 2002 FIBA World Championship, and a silver medal at the EuroBasket 2005.

References

External links
Euroleague.net Profile
FIBA.com Profile

1972 births
Living people
Alba Berlin players
Basketball Löwen Braunschweig players
Centers (basketball)
Dafnis B.C. players
German men's basketball players
Maroussi B.C. players
Olympia Larissa B.C. players
Panionios B.C. players
Papagou B.C. players
Sportspeople from Hanover
Power forwards (basketball)
Ratiopharm Ulm players
German sportspeople of Nigerian descent
2002 FIBA World Championship players